Pultenaea victoriensis is a species of flowering plant in the family Fabaceae and is endemic to a restricted area of Victoria, Australia. It is a shrub with hairy young stems, wedge-shaped to oblong leaves with a notched tip, and yellow and dark red, pea-like flowers.

Description

Taxonomy
Pultenaea victoriensis was first formally described in 1993 by Margaret G. Corrick in the journal Muelleria from specimens she collected near the Victoria Range Track in the Western Grampians in 1991.

Distribution and habitat
Pultenaea victoriensis only occurs on the high rocky slopes of the Victoria Range at altitudes above .

References

Fabales of Australia
Flora of Victoria (Australia)
victoriensis
Plants described in 1993